Arcaea is a rhythm video game developed and published by Lowiro (stylized as lowiro). The game was released on iOS and Android mobile platforms on 9 March 2017.  

A single-player version of the game was released for the Nintendo Switch on 18 May 2021.

Reception 
Eric Ford of TouchArcade says that it has "an awesome art style combined with very up-beat songs and a nice twist to the traditional rhythm formula". But he also mentioned that some of the gameplay elements could make the game potentially difficult.

References

External links 

 
 
2017 video games
Indie video games
Music video games
Video games developed in the United Kingdom
Android (operating system) games
IOS games
Nintendo Switch games